In Mandaeism, Ṣaureil, also spelled Ṣauriel or Ṣaurʿil, is the angel of death. Ṣaureil features prominently in Book 1 of the Left Ginza as the angel who announces the message of death to Adam and Seth (Sheetil).

Ṣaureil is also an epithet for the Moon (Sen).

In the Ginza Rabba
He is also known as Ṣaureil Qmamir Ziwa (or Qamamir-Ziwa) in Book 1 of the Left Ginza. According to the Left Ginza, he is called "Death" in the world, but as Kushta ("Truth") to those who know of Ṣaureil's true heavenly nature.

See also
 Abaddon, also called Apollyon, a destroying angel in the Book of Revelation
 Azrael, also known as Malak al-Maut, in Islam
 Destroying angel (Bible), or angel of death
 Gabriel, angel of death over kings
 List of angels in theology
 Michael (archangel), good angel of death
 Mot (god), an angel of death from the Hebraic Book of Habakkuk
 Nasirdin and Sejadin, angels of death in Yazidism
 Psychopomp, a creature, spirit, angel, or deity in many religions, responsible for escorting souls to the afterlife
 Samael, an important archangel in Talmudic and post-Talmudic lore
 Santa Muerte, a sacred figure venerated primarily in Mexico
 Shinigami, god or spirit of death in Japanese mythology
 Yama, lord of death, in early Rigvedic Hinduism

References

Individual angels
Uthras
Psychopomps
Angels of death
Personifications in Mandaeism